The 2021 Copa Libertadores qualifying stages were played from 23 February to 15 April 2021. A total of 19 teams competed in the qualifying stages to decide four of the 32 places in the group stage of the 2021 Copa Libertadores.

The qualifying stages had been originally scheduled to be played from 16 February to 8 April 2021.

Draw

The draw for the qualifying stages was held on 5 February 2021, 12:00 PYST (UTC−3), at the CONMEBOL Convention Centre in Luque, Paraguay.

Teams were seeded by their CONMEBOL Clubs ranking as of 1 February 2021 (shown in parentheses), taking into account the following three factors:
Performance in the last 10 years, taking into account Copa Libertadores and Copa Sudamericana results in the period 2011–2020.
Historical coefficient, taking into account Copa Libertadores and Copa Sudamericana results in the period 1960–2010 and 2002-2010 respectively.
Local tournament champion, with bonus points awarded to domestic league champions of the last 10 years

For the first stage, the six teams were drawn into three ties (E1–E3), with the teams from Pot 1 hosting the second leg.

Notes

For the second stage, the 16 teams were drawn into eight ties (C1–C8), with the teams from Pot 1 hosting the second leg. Teams from the same association could not be drawn into the same tie, excluding the three winners of the first stage, which were seeded in Pot 2 and whose identity was not known at the time of the draw, and could be drawn into the same tie with another team from the same association.

Notes

For the third stage, the eight winners of the second stage were allocated without any draw into the following four ties (G1–G4), with the team in each tie with the higher CONMEBOL ranking hosting the second leg. As their identity was not known at the time of the draw, they could be drawn into the same tie with another team from the same association.

Second stage winner C1 vs. Second stage winner C8
Second stage winner C2 vs. Second stage winner C7
Second stage winner C3 vs. Second stage winner C6
Second stage winner C4 vs. Second stage winner C5

Format

In the qualifying stages, each tie is played on a home-and-away two-legged basis. If tied on aggregate, the away goals rule will be used. If still tied, extra time will not be played, and a penalty shoot-out will be used to determine the winner (Regulations Article 2.4.3).

Bracket

The qualifying stages are structured as follows:
First stage (6 teams): The three winners of the first stage advance to the second stage to join the 13 teams which are given byes to the second stage.
Second stage (16 teams): The eight winners of the second stage advance to the third stage.
Third stage (8 teams): The four winners of the third stage advance to the group stage to join the 28 direct entrants. The four teams eliminated in the third stage enter the Copa Sudamericana group stage.
The bracket was decided based on the first stage draw and second stage draw, which was held on 5 February 2021.

Winner G1

Winner G2

Winner G3

Winner G4

First stage
The first legs were played on 23 and 24 February, and the second legs were played on 2 and 3 March 2021.

|}

Match E1

Universidad Católica won 4–2 on aggregate and advanced to the second stage (Match C1).

Match E2

Caracas won 2–0 on aggregate and advanced to the second stage (Match C6).

Match E3

Guaraní won 5–2 on aggregate and advanced to the second stage (Match C8).

Second stage
The first legs were played on 9–11 March, and the second legs were played on 16–18 March 2021.

|}

Match C1

Libertad won 3–2 on aggregate and advanced to the third stage (Match G1).

Match C2

Grêmio won 8–2 on aggregate and advanced to the third stage (Match G2).

Match C3

Bolívar won 5–1 on aggregate and advanced to the third stage (Match G3).

Match C4

San Lorenzo won 3–1 on aggregate and advanced to the third stage (Match G4).

Match C5

Santos won 3–2 on aggregate and advanced to the third stage (Match G4).

Match C6

Junior won 5–2 on aggregate and advanced to the third stage (Match G3).

Match C7

Independiente del Valle won 6–3 on aggregate and advanced to the third stage (Match G2).

Match C8

Atlético Nacional won 5–0 on aggregate and advanced to the third stage (Match G1).

Third stage
The first legs were played on 6–9 April, and the second legs were played on 13–15 April 2021.

|}

Match G1

Atlético Nacional won 4–2 on aggregate and advanced to the group stage (Group F).

Match G2

Independiente del Valle won 4–2 on aggregate and advanced to the group stage (Group A).

Match G3

Junior won 4–2 on aggregate and advanced to the group stage (Group D).

Match G4

Santos won 5–3 on aggregate and advanced to the group stage (Group C).

Notes

References

External links
CONMEBOL Libertadores 2021, CONMEBOL.com

1
February 2021 sports events in South America
March 2021 sports events in South America
April 2021 sports events in South America